Uybulatovo (Uybulat) is a rural locality (a selo) in Chekmagushevsky District, Bashkortostan, Russia. The population was 262 in 2010. There are two streets.

Geography 
Yumashevo is the nearest rural locality.

References 

Rural localities in Chekmagushevsky District